The Mayor of Cuneo is an elected politician who, along with the Cuneo's City Council, is accountable for the strategic government of Cuneo in Piedmont, Italy. The current Mayor is Patrizia Manassero, a member of the centre-left Democratic Party, who took office on 4 July 2022.

Overview
According to the Italian Constitution, the Mayor of Cuneo is member of the City Council.

The Mayor is elected by the population of Cuneo, who also elects the members of the City Council, controlling the Mayor's policy guidelines and is able to enforce his resignation by a motion of no confidence. The Mayor is entitled to appoint and release the members of his government.

Since 1993 the Mayor is elected directly by Cuneo's electorate: in all mayoral elections in Italy in cities with a population higher than 15,000 the voters express a direct choice for the mayor or an indirect choice voting for the party of the candidate's coalition. If no candidate receives at least 50% of votes, the top two candidates go to a second round after two weeks. The election of the City Council is based on a direct choice for the candidate with a preference vote: the candidate with the majority of the preferences is elected. The number of the seats for each party is determined proportionally.

Italian Republic (since 1946)

City Council election (1946-1995)
From 1946 to 1995, the Mayor of Cuneo was elected by the City's Council.

Direct election (since 1995)
Since 1995, under provisions of new local administration law, the Mayor of Cuneo is chosen by direct election.

References

Cuneo
 
Politics of Piedmont
Cuneo